On Guard For Thee was a Canadian documentary television miniseries which aired on CBC Television in 1981.

Premise
This series concerns the history and status of Canadian national security following World War II, particularly the national security role which the Royal Canadian Mounted Police held until the formation of the Canadian Security Intelligence Service in 1984. Episodes included historic footage, dramatized reconstructions, excerpts from the 1948 motion picture The Iron Curtain and new interview footage. It was a co-production of the National Film Board of Canada and CBC.

Scheduling
This hour-long series was broadcast Sundays at 10:00 p.m. as follows:

 18 October 1981: "The Most Dangerous Spy" features Igor Gouzenko who defected to Canada in 1946 and revealed Soviet Union spy activities in Canada
 25 October 1981: "A Blanket Of Ice" regards the Cold War, with investigations of the diplomatic and public service sectors, and RCMP secret operations up to the 1970 October Crisis
 1 November 1981: "Shadows Of A Horseman" features the actions and controversies of the RCMP since the McKenzie Commission report of 1969 which recommended that national security operations be separated from the RCMP, and the 1977 establishment of the McDonald Commission

References

External links
 
 
 
 

CBC Television original programming
1981 Canadian television series debuts
1981 Canadian television series endings
1980s Canadian documentary television series
Works about Canada and the Cold War